Tahseen Jabbary is a Dutch professional association football coach.

Career
Jabbary started his coaching career with VV Leiden (nl) in the Netherlands in 1996–97, he later joined the coaching staff at Club América in Mexico in 1997. Afterwards, he joined Anyang LG Cheetahs in South Korea and FC Tokyo in Japan until 1998. Then he returned to the Netherlands to coach VFC (nl) from 1999 to 2002. He later joined the Congo national football team staff in 2002, then SBV Excelsior in 2004–05. He coached Dibba Al-Fujairah from 2005 until 2007. In 2008, he coached Al Dhaid in the UAE.

Jabbary was the coach of Syrian team Al-Majd at the 2009 AFC Cup. He later coached the Omani team Al-Orouba from 2011 to 2012, then he became the development coach for the Burkina Faso national football team from 2012 to 2014. He later returned to Japan to join Kashiwa Reysol from August 2016 to February 2017, then he worked as a technical director of football at Baniyas Club from 2017 to 2019.

References

External links
 

Living people
Sportspeople from Rotterdam
Dutch football managers
Dutch people of Iraqi descent
Al-Oruba SC managers
Al-Ta'ee managers
Saudi First Division League managers
Dutch expatriate football managers
Expatriate football managers in the United Arab Emirates
Expatriate football managers in Syria
Expatriate football managers in Saudi Arabia
Expatriate football managers in Oman
Dutch expatriate sportspeople in Saudi Arabia
Dutch expatriate sportspeople in the United Arab Emirates
Dutch expatriate sportspeople in Syria
1964 births
Dutch expatriate sportspeople in Burkina Faso
Dutch expatriate sportspeople in Mexico
Dutch expatriate sportspeople in South Korea
Association football coaches
Dutch expatriate sportspeople in Oman
Dutch expatriate sportspeople in Japan
FC Seoul non-playing staff
Dibba Club managers
Al Dhaid SC managers
Club América non-playing staff
Dutch expatriate sportspeople in the Republic of the Congo
Congo national football team managers